Chalcopteryx machadoi
Chalcopteryx radians
Chalcopteryx rutilans
Chalcopteryx scintillans
Chalcopteryx seabrai
Chalcothore montgomeryi
Cora chiribiquete
Cora chirripa
Cora confusa
Cora cyane
Cora dorata
Cora dualis
Cora inca
Cora irene
Cora jocosa
Cora klenri
Cora lugubris
Cora marina
Cora modesta
Cora munda
Cora notoxantha
Cora obscura
Cora parda
Cora semiopaca
Cora skinneri
Cora subfumat'''Cora terminalisCora xanthostomaEuthore fasciataEuthore fassliEuthore hyalinaEuthore inlacteaEuthore leroiiEuthore mirabilisMiocora pellucidaMiocora peralticaPolythore auroraPolythore batesiPolythore beataPolythore bolivianaPolythore concinnaPolythore derivataPolythore giganteaPolythore lamercedaPolythore manuaPolythore mutataPolythore neopictaPolythore ornataPolythore pictaPolythore proceraPolythore spaeteriPolythore terminataPolythore victoriaPolythore vittataPolythore williamsoniStenocora percornuta''

References